Kim Seung-il may refer to:

Kim Seung-il (gymnast) (born 1985), South Korean gymnast
Kim Seung-il (footballer) (born 1945), North Korean footballer

See also
Kim Sung-il (disambiguation)